Viktor Viktorov Genev (born 27 October 1988) is a Bulgarian  professional footballer who plays as a defender for Botev Plovdiv.

Club career

Levski Sofia

2007–2008
During the first half of the 2007–2008 season, Genev played for Montana on loan.

He made his official debut for Levski Sofia on 19 March 2008 in a match against Lokomotiv Plovdiv, which Levski lost 1–0.

2008–2009
Apart from the 2007–2008 season, during 2008–2009 Genev started playing often for the first team wearing the kit with number 2. He also played for the Bulgarian national football team under 21 as a defender.

He became a Champion of Bulgaria in 2009.

2009–2010
On 15 July 2009, Victor made his debut in Europe for the first official match for Levski during the 2009–2010 season. The event took place in the 2nd qualifying round of the UEFA Champions League, when Levski encountered UE Sant Julià. The match ended 4–0 with a home win for The Blues.

Slavia Sofia
On 23 June 2010, Genev signed a contract with Slavia Sofia for an undisclosed transfer fee.

Spartak Semey
Genev joined newly promoted Kazakhstan Premier League club Spartak Semey in January 2014 for a period of one year. He made his official debut on 15 March, in the 2–1 away loss against FC Tobol in a league match and scored his first goal for the Semey club in the 2–1 win over the same opponent on 3 August.

St Mirren
On 26 February 2015, Genev signed for Scottish Premiership club St Mirren for the remainder of the season, following a successful trial. He made his debut two days after signing, in a 1–0 home win against Hamilton Academical. Genev left the club when his contract expired, following Saints relegation to the Scottish Championship.

Petrolul Ploiești
On 7 September 2015, Genev joined Romanian side FC Petrolul Ploiești on a one-year contract.

Dinamo Minsk
Genev had a short stint in the Belarusian Premier League with Dinamo Minsk between February and July 2016.

Botev Plovdiv

2016–17

On 6 February 2017, Genev signed with Botev Plovdiv until the end of the season. He made an official debut on 18 February during the 0-1 away win over Lokomotiv Gorna Oryahovitsa.

On 24 May 2017 Genev played an important role in the historical 2-1 win over Ludogorets Razgrad in the Bulgarian Cup final and won the cup with Botev Plovdiv.

2017–18

Viktor Genev played in all 6 games for Botev Plovdiv during the participation of the club in UEFA Europa League. On 9 August 2017 he scored a penalty during the penalty shootout and Botev Plovdiv defeated Ludogorets Razgrad and won the Bulgarian Supercup. Shortly after winning the Supercup, on 23 August, Viktor Genev left Botev Plovdiv on a mutual agreement because he received a better offer from F.C. Ashdod in Israel. Genev played 28 games in all competitions for Botev Plovdiv.

Honours

Club
Levski Sofia
 Bulgarian A Group: 2008–09
 Bulgarian Supercup: 2007, 2009

Botev Plovdiv
 Bulgarian Cup: 2016–17
 Bulgarian Supercup: 2017

References

External links
 
 
 

1988 births
Living people
Footballers from Sofia
Bulgarian footballers
Bulgarian expatriate footballers
FC Montana players
PFC Levski Sofia players
PFC Slavia Sofia players
Botev Plovdiv players
PFC Krylia Sovetov Samara players
FC Oleksandriya players
FC Spartak Semey players
Expatriate footballers in Russia
Expatriate footballers in Ukraine
Expatriate footballers in Kazakhstan
Expatriate footballers in Scotland
Expatriate footballers in Belarus
Expatriate footballers in Israel
Bulgarian expatriate sportspeople in Russia
Bulgarian expatriate sportspeople in Ukraine
Bulgarian expatriate sportspeople in Kazakhstan
Bulgarian expatriate sportspeople in Scotland
Bulgarian expatriate sportspeople in Romania
Bulgarian expatriate sportspeople in Israel
First Professional Football League (Bulgaria) players
Russian Premier League players
Ukrainian Premier League players
Kazakhstan Premier League players
Israeli Premier League players
St Mirren F.C. players
Liga I players
FC Petrolul Ploiești players
FC Dinamo Minsk players
F.C. Ashdod players
PFC Cherno More Varna players
PFC Beroe Stara Zagora players
Association football defenders